The Sakurajima radish or Sakurajima daikon (Sakurajima daikon) is a special cultivar of the Japanese radish named for its original place of cultivation, the former island of Sakurajima in Japan's Kagoshima Prefecture. It is the biggest radish variety in the world. It is also sometimes known in Japanese as shimadekon ("island daikon").

The three varieties are early, middle, and late, but the most commonly encountered form is the late. The seeding period is from last August to first September and the harvest season is from December to February. To reach full size, special care needs to be taken with the region's volcanic-ash soil.

Names
In English, the Sakurajima radish is also sometimes known as the Sakurajima island giant radish, giant daikon, or jumbo daikon.

Uses
Sakurajima radish has a fine texture and is low in fiber. It is sweeter than other varieties of Japanese radish. In Japanese cuisine, it is typically prepared by simmering to produce dishes such as furofuki daikon. Kiriboshi daikon and tsukemono are popular prepared foods which also employ the radish. The large size of tsukemono, senmaizuke, is sold in souvenir shops in Kagoshima.

History
Three theories are given about its development:

 An origin from an original wild daikon in Sakurajima
 An origin from hōryō daikon in Aichi Prefecture
 An origin from kokubu daikon (hamanoichi daikon)

An 1804 mention of Kagoshima in reference to the giant Sakurajima radish shows it was cultured before then at least. The main production was north-west of Sakurajima, but it was moved to the north later. Sakurajima radish is one of the most precious local commercial crops. Also, in every harvest season, the toikae (Kagoshima dialect for "market") was held in Kajiki (now part of Aira District) and people traded Sakurajima radishes with straw. Furthermore, its growing area was decreased to about  owing to ashfall between then and 2001.

The main growing districts of now are the suburbs of Kagoshima city and Kirishima city. Because of fewer eruptions recently, the growing area has been extended.

References

今村知子　『かごしま文庫51　鹿児島の料理』　春苑堂出版、1999年、 
串間俊文　『かごしま文庫26　鹿児島の園芸植物』　春苑堂出版、1995年、 
橋村健一　『かごしま文庫13　桜島大噴火』　春苑堂出版、1994年、

External links
JA Kagoshima Mirai Specialty products Sakurajima radish

Asian radishes
Root vegetables
Japanese cuisine terms